The 1981 Rice Owls football team was an American football team that represented Rice University in the Southwest Conference during the 1981 NCAA Division I-A football season. In their fourth year under head coach Ray Alborn, the team compiled a 4–7 record.

Schedule

References

Rice
Rice Owls football seasons
Rice Owls football